Thomas Harp (born c. 1927) is a former American football player and coach.  He served as the head football coach at Cornell University (1961–1965), Duke University (1967–1970), and Indiana State University (1973–1977), compiling a career college football record of 61–82–4.

Playing career
Harp played football as a fullback at Miami University in 1945 and then as a quarterback at Muskingum University in 1949 and 1950, where he was a member of back-to-back Ohio Athletic Conference championship squads.

Coaching career
Harp began his coaching career in 1951 at Carrollton High School in Carrollton, Ohio, where he compiled a record of 20–6–1 over three seasons.  He then moved on to Massillon Washington High School in Massillon, Ohio, tallying a mark of 18–2 over two seasons and winning the Ohio State title in 1954.  From 1956 to 1960, Harp coached the backfield at the United States Military Academy under head coaches Earl Blaik and Dale Hall.

From 1961 to 1965, Harp coached at Cornell, where he compiled a 19–23–3 record. From 1966 to 1970, he coached at Duke, where he compiled a 22–28–1 record. From 1973 to 1977, he coached at Indiana State, where he compiled a 20–31 record.

Family
Harp is the stepfather of former Miami Dolphins head coach Cam Cameron.

Head coaching record

References

1920s births
Living people
Army Black Knights football coaches
Cornell Big Red football coaches
Duke Blue Devils football coaches
Indiana State Sycamores football coaches
Miami RedHawks football players
Muskingum Fighting Muskies football players
High school football coaches in Ohio
People from Belmont County, Ohio